Fikile Devilliers Xasa is a South African politician currently serving as the Chairperson of the Portfolio Committee on Cooperative Governance and Traditional Affairs since 2021. He has been a Member of the National Assembly for the African National Congress since 2019.

Political career
Xasa had served as an ANC Member of the Eastern Cape Provincial Legislature. In May 2014, he was appointed by premier Phumulo Masualle as the Member of the Executive Council (MEC) responsible for Cooperative Governance and Traditional Affairs.

Xasa was elected to the National Assembly in the 2019 general election from the ANC's National List. He was elected to chair the Portfolio Committee on Environment, Forestry and Fisheries.

On 26 August 2021, the ANC announced that Xasa and the Chairperson of the Portfolio Committee on Cooperative Governance and Traditional Affairs, Faith Muthambi, would swap positions.

References

External links

Profile at Parliament of South Africa

Living people
Year of birth missing (living people)
Xhosa people
People from the Eastern Cape
Members of the National Assembly of South Africa
Members of the Eastern Cape Provincial Legislature
African National Congress politicians